Prothylacinus is an extinct genus of South American metatherian, that lived during the Early Miocene.

Distribution 
Fossils of Prothylacinus have been found in the Friasian Río Frias Formation of Chile and the Santacrucian Santa Cruz Formation of Argentina.

References 

Sparassodonts
Miocene mammals of South America
Friasian
Santacrucian
Neogene Argentina
Fossils of Argentina
Neogene Chile
Fossils of Chile
Fossil taxa described in 1891
Taxa named by Florentino Ameghino
Prehistoric mammal genera